Agent Orange is the third studio album by German thrash metal band Sodom, released on 1 June 1989 by SPV/Steamhammer. It was their last album with guitarist Frank Blackfire (who would later join Kreator) until his return to the band in 2018. The lyrical content delves deeply into Tom Angelripper's fascination with the Vietnam War, with a song dedicated to the ground assault aircraft AC-47 as well as the Agent orange defoliant-inspired title-track. It was their first album to enter the German album charts where it reached number 36. Agent Orange sold 100,000 copies in Germany alone and marked the commercial break through for the band. The song "Ausgebombt" was released on the EP Ausgebombt with German lyrics.

The album's liner notes carry the message: "This album is dedicated to all people – soldiers and civilians – who died by senseless aggressions of wars all over the world."

In March 2010, Agent Orange was re-released in a digipak with bonus tracks and liner notes containing lyrics and rare photos.

Critical reception

In 2005, Agent Orange was ranked number 299 in Rock Hard magazine's book of The 500 Greatest Rock & Metal Albums of All Time. In 2017, Rolling Stone ranked Agent Orange as 63rd on their list of 'The 100 Greatest Metal Albums of All Time'.

Track listing

Track 9 is a bonus track for initial CD pressings.

Personnel
Sodom
 Tom Angelripper – vocals, bass
 Frank Blackfire – guitars
 Chris Witchhunter – drums

Production
Harris Johns – production, engineering, mixing
Andreas Marschall – cover art
Manfred Eisenblätter – photography

Ausgebombt EP 
The band released two songs from Agent Orange on its third EP, Ausgebombt.

Track listing

Charts

See also
 List of anti-war songs

References 

Sodom (band) albums
1989 albums
SPV/Steamhammer albums
Albums produced by Harris Johns